Zirikly (Yerekle) is a rural locality (a village) in Tolparovsky Selsoviet, Gafuriysky District, Bashkortostan, Russia. The population was 29 as of 2010. There are 2 streets.

Geography 
Zirikly is located 62 km northeast of Krasnousolsky (the district's administrative centre) by road. Mendim is the nearest rural locality.

References 

Rural localities in Gafuriysky District